Sri Shirdi Saibaba Mahathyam  is a 1986 Telugu-language musical biograhical film written and directed by K. Vasu, based on the life of Shirdi Sai Baba, who has preached and practiced Religious humanism. Vijayachander portrayed the role of Baba. The film was a blockbuster and remained a cult classic.  The film ran for 175 days in 12 centers, was screened at the International Film Festival of India and the Moscow Film Festival.  The soundtrack was composed by Ilaiyaraaja, with lyrics written by Acharya Aatreya, and received wide appreciation. The film was dubbed into Hindi as Shirdi Sai Baba Ki Kahani and into Tamil as Sri Shirdi Saibaba.

Plot
Sadguru Sai Baba of Shirdi lived in British India. He was initially shunned by both Hindus and Muslims, especially by Hindu Bal Bhate. Sai was a Muslim and Bal Bhate forbade him to enter any Temple. Rohila, a Muslim, who thought Sai was desecrating the local Masjid by performing Hindu prayers and incantations, attempted to kill Sai. Then he saw both the Allah and Bhagwan in Sai and became a devotee. When Sai was ready to give up his body and resurrect himself after 3 days, just like Lord Jesus, a disbelieving Bal had wanted Sai's body to be cremated within 24 hours - only to find out that Sai had indeed risen, and also became his devotee.

Bhagoti, a leper, who was cured by Sai became his follower. Though Sai had no relations, he did call Tatya's mother his sister; Tatya his maternal nephew; a devotee named Laxmi as his daughter, and an elderly woman as his mother. Sai displayed his true form and opulence to another devotee, Nana Chandorkar. Sai lived in a rebuilt Masjid and urged his devotees to pray to God, as the Creator and to love and respect all living beings. He begged for alms daily so that he could collect sins and wash them away.

He always uttered "Allah Bhala Kare" and "Bhagwan Bhala Kare" to both Muslims and Hindus alike. He appeared in a multitude forms to his devotees (Lord Jesus, Guru Nanak Devji, Allah, Bhagwan Shri Ganesh) to cater to the various tastes of devotees. Sai was also fond of Nanavli, a mentally challenged devotee, who often challenged Sai. He was one of the few who really understood and accepted Sai as Vishnu's Avatar. Sai appeared simultaneously in a wealthy man's and Nana's dreams and called upon them to construct a Mandir of Bhagwan Shri Krishna. While the construction was under way, Sai prophesied the death of Tatya. Shortly thereafter while bequeathing the nine coins symbolizing nine virtues to Laxmi (which depict Sravan, Kirtan, Smaran, Padaseva, Archana, Namaskar, Dastan, Samveta and Atmanivrdan) Sai was ready to demonstrate to his devotees why they should not worry about Tatya's impending demise.

Cast

 Vijayachander as Shirdi Sai Baba
 Chandra Mohan as Nanavali
 Kanta Rao as Shyama
 Seshagiri Rao as Mahalsapathi
 Anjali Devi as Baayeeja Bai
 Sarath Babu as Chand Patel
 J. V. Somayajulu as Nana Chandorkar
 Ramakrishna as Aayaram 
 Chalam as Gayaram
 Suthi Veerabhadra Rao as Bal Bhate
 Tyagaraaju as Daroga Dasuganu
 Adabala as Bhagoti
 Jaya Bhaskar as Ramachandra Patil
 Raja as Tatya Patil
 Kanchana
 Murali Mohan
 Ramaprabha
 Rushyendramani
 Sridhar
 Vijaya Chamadeswari

Soundtrack
The music rights of the film were acquired by Aditya Music
 "Baba Sai Baba Neevu Maavale Manishivani" (Music director: Ilaiyaraaja; Singer: S. P. Balasubrahmanyam)
 "Daivam Manava Roopamlo Avatarinchunee Lokamlo" (Music director: Ilaiyaraaja; Singer: P. Susheela)
 "Hey Panduranga Hey Pandarinadha Saranam" (Music director: Ilaiyaraaja; Singer: Yesudas)
 "Jai Shirdi Naadha Saideva" (Dandakam) (Music director: Ilaiyaraaja; Singer: V. Ramakrishna) 	
 "Maa Paapala Tolaginchu Deepala Neeve Veliginchinavayya" (Music director: Ilaiyaraaja; Singer: Yesudas) 	
 "Nuvvu Leka Anadhalam Bratukanta Ayomayam Baba" (Music director: Ilaiyaraaja; Singer: S. P. Balasubrahmanyam and Chorus)
 "Slokams" (Music director: Ilaiyaraaja; Singer: Yesudas)

References

External links
 Listen to Sri Shirdi Saibaba Mahathyam songs at Raaga.com
 

1986 films
1980s Telugu-language films
Indian biographical films
Indian films based on actual events
Films scored by Ilaiyaraaja
Sai Baba of Shirdi
Hindu devotional films
Indian historical films
1980s biographical films
1980s historical films
Films directed by K. Vasu